Linzi Stadium is a football stadium in Linzi, China.  It hosts football matches and hosted the 2010 AFC U-19 Championship.  The stadium holds 14,000 spectators.

External links
Stadium information

Football venues in China
Sports venues in Shandong